Lt-Col. Samuel Hall-Thompson (1885 – 26 October 1954) was a Unionist politician from Northern Ireland.

Hall-Thompson was born at Crawfordsburn in Ulster.  He studied at Dulwich College, England.  His father, Rt. Hon. Robert Thompson, DL, was also an MP.  Samuel went into business and, in 1929, served as High Sheriff of Belfast.

At the 1929 Northern Ireland general election, Hall-Thompson was elected as the Ulster Unionist Party Member of Parliament for Belfast Clifton.  In 1939, he was appointed Chief Ordnance Officer for Northern Ireland, and from 1944 until 1950 he served as Minister of Education. This position carried with it membership of the Privy Council of Northern Ireland. Hall-Thompson suffered criticism from some Unionists for appearing to compromise with the Roman Catholic Church while in this position. He was not a member of the Orange Order.

In 1950, Hall-Thompson was appointed Chairman of Ways and Means Committee and Deputy Speaker of the Northern Ireland House of Commons.  At the 1953 general election, he was defeated by Norman Porter, an independent Unionist who had been an outspoken and stern critic.

Samuel's son, Lloyd Hall-Thompson, later became an MP in Northern Ireland.

References

1885 births
1954 deaths
High Sheriffs of Belfast
Members of the House of Commons of Northern Ireland 1929–1933
Members of the House of Commons of Northern Ireland 1933–1938
Members of the House of Commons of Northern Ireland 1938–1945
Members of the House of Commons of Northern Ireland 1945–1949
Members of the House of Commons of Northern Ireland 1949–1953
Northern Ireland Cabinet ministers (Parliament of Northern Ireland)
Members of the Privy Council of Northern Ireland
People educated at Dulwich College
Politicians from County Down
Ulster Unionist Party members of the House of Commons of Northern Ireland
Members of the House of Commons of Northern Ireland for Belfast constituencies